Putanges-le-Lac is a commune in the department of Orne, northwestern France. The municipality was established on 1 January 2016 by merger of the former communes of Chênedouit, La Forêt-Auvray, La Fresnaye-au-Sauvage, Ménil-Jean, Putanges-Pont-Écrepin (the seat), Rabodanges, Les Rotours, Saint-Aubert-sur-Orne and Sainte-Croix-sur-Orne.

See also 
Communes of the Orne department

References 

Communes of Orne
Populated places established in 2016
2016 establishments in France